GXO Logistics, Inc. (trade name GXO) is an American global contract logistics company that manages outsourced supply chains and warehousing. GXO's corporate headquarters are located in Greenwich, Connecticut, U.S.

History 
In December 2020, XPO Logistics announced that it would spin off its global contract logistics segment into a separate company, GXO Logistics Inc. The spin-off was completed in August 2021, with American businessman Brad Jacobs as Non-Executive Chairman, Malcolm Wilson as CEO, and Baris Oran as CFO.

In May 2022 the acquisition by GXO of the UK-based retail logistics company, Clipper Logistics plc was announced.

In January 2023, GXO extended its partnership with French manufacturer Groupe SEB.

Operations 
GXO operates approximately 869 warehouses with 208 million square feet of facility space, making it the largest third-party pure-play contract logistics provider globally. GXO's contract logistics customers operate in retail, e-commerce, technology, aerospace, telecom, food and beverage, healthcare, agriculture and infrastructure.

Technology 
A number of IT professionals and data scientists work at GXO in the fields of automation and intelligent machines, forecasting demand, predictive analytics, pricing algorithms, and workforce planning.

A joint venture between GXO and Nestlé opened a “warehouse of the future” in Leicestershire in 2020. The distribution center is a “testbed” for new technologies in logistics.

See also 

 Economy of Connecticut

References

External links

Logistics companies of the United States
Companies based in Greenwich, Connecticut
Companies listed on the New York Stock Exchange
Corporate spin-offs
American companies established in 2021